The Bahraini ambassador in Washington, D. C. is the official representative of the Government in Manama to the Government of the United States.

List of representatives

See also
 Bahrain–United States relations
 Embassy of Bahrain, Washington, D.C.
 Ambassadors of the United States to Bahrain
 Embassy of the United States, Manama

References

 
United States
Bahrain